The Journal of Knot Theory and Its Ramifications was established in 1992 by Louis Kauffman and was the first journal purely devoted to knot theory. It is an interdisciplinary journal covering developments in knot theory, with emphasis on creating connections between with other branches of mathematics and the natural sciences. The journal is published by World Scientific.

According to the Journal Citation Reports, the journal has a 2020 impact factor of 0.379.

Abstracting and indexing 
The journal is abstracted and indexed in:

 Science Citation Index
 ISI Alerting Services
 CompuMath Citation Index
 Current Contents/Physical, Chemical & Earth Sciences
 Mathematical Reviews
 Zentralblatt MATH

See also 
 History of knot theory

References

External links 
 

English-language journals
Mathematics journals
Publications established in 1992
World Scientific academic journals